Pohang Station is a railway station in the city of Pohang, South Korea. The station is the terminus of the Donghae Line.

Services
It is serves by Mugunghwa-ho on the Donghae Line that runs to Yeongdeok, Dongdaegu, Bujeon and Suncheon. The KTX trains that runs between Seoul and Pohang that began in service on March 31, 2015, after the completion of the new building on February 24, 2015.

Former station

The station was originally located at 7 Yongdang-ro 91beon-gil, Jungang-dong, that opened on November 1, 1918, In 2015, due to the switch to the new line, it was moved to the new location that opened on April 2, 2015, and the old station was demolished.

Station layout
Pohang station has 4 platforms for Mugunghwa-ho and KTX.

Platforms

References

Railway stations in North Gyeongsang Province
Pohang
Railway stations opened in 2015
2015 establishments in South Korea